Suining is a prefecture-level city in Sichuan, China.

Suining may also refer to:

Suining County, Jiangsu, county under the jurisdiction of Xuzhou, Jiangsu
Suining County, Hunan, county under the jurisdiction of Shaoyang, Hunan
Suining, Jiaozhi, a former district of Songping in Chinese Vietnam